"Indian Reservation (The Lament of the Cherokee Reservation Indian)" is a song written by John D. Loudermilk. It was first recorded by Marvin Rainwater in 1959 and released on MGM as "The Pale Faced Indian", but that release went unnoticed. The first hit version was a 1968 recording by Don Fardon a former member of the Sorrows that reached number 20 on the Hot 100 in 1968 and number 3 on the UK Singles Chart in 1970.

In 1971, the Raiders recorded "Indian Reservation" for Columbia Records, and it topped the Hot 100 on July 24. On June 30, 1971, the RIAA gold certified the record for selling over a million copies. The record was later certified platinum for selling an additional million copies. The song was the group's only Hot 100 Number 1 hit and their final Hot 100 Top 20 song.

Lyrics 
A well-known story told by Loudermilk is that when he was asked by the Viva! NashVegas radio show about the origins of the song "Indian Reservation," he fabricated the story that he wrote the song after his car was snowed in by a blizzard and he was taken in by a small group of Cherokee Indians. A self-professed prankster, he spun the tale that a Cherokee chieftain, "Bloody Bear Tooth," asked him to make a song about his people's plight on the Trail of Tears, even going so far as to claim that he had later been awarded "the first medal of the Cherokee Nation," not for writing the song, but for his "blood." He went on to fabricate the detail that on that day the tribe revealed that his "great-great-grandparents, Homer and Matilda Loudermilk" were listed on the Dawes Rolls (the citizenship rolls of the Nation). Had this detail of his tall tale been true, he would have been a citizen of the Cherokee Nation, which he was not.

In spite of the song's title, the Eastern Band of Cherokee Indians, the United Keetoowah Band of Cherokee Indians and the Cherokee Nation of Oklahoma are not known as "reservations", and singing that they may someday "return" is at odds with the fact that these Cherokee Nations still exist.

The lyrics vary somewhat among the recorded versions. Rainwater's version lacks the "Cherokee people!" chorus but includes instead a series of "Hiya, hiya, ho!" chants. Fardon's version is similar to the Raiders' through the first verse and chorus, but differs in the second verse, which includes the lines "Altho' they changed our ways of old/They'll never change our heart and soul", also found in Rainwater's version. Rainwater includes some of the elements found in the other versions in a different order, and his first verse has words not found in the others, such as "They put our papoose in a crib/and took the buck skin from our rib".

At the end, where the Raiders sing "...Cherokee nation will return", Fardon says "Cherokee Indian...", while the line is absent in Rainwater's version, which ends with "beads...nowadays made in Japan." In addition, Fardon sings the line: "Brick built houses by the score/ No more tepees anymore", not used in the Raiders' version.

Cherokee people have never lived in tipis, nor do they use the term "papoose". These are stereotypes and misconceptions, with the reservations and tipi assumptions usually based on Hollywood portrayals of Plains Indians. However, the Cherokee are a Southeastern Woodlands Indigenous culture.

Among the things taken away from the Cherokees include the tomahawk and the Golden Knife. Also, English replaced their native tongue. In addition, the Raiders' version mentions that "though I wear a shirt and tie, I'm still a red man deep inside", altered from the Rainwater-sung line "and though I wear a white man's tie / I'll be a red man 'til I die".

Song structure 

The music is in a minor key, with sustained minor chords ending each phrase in the primary melody, while the melody line goes through a slow musical turn (turning of related notes) which ends each phrase, and emphasizes the ominous minor chords. Underneath the slow, paced melody, is a rhythmic, low "drum beat" in double-time, constantly, relentlessly pushing to follow along, but the melody continues its slow, deliberate pace above the drum beat.

The instrumentation varies among versions. Rainwater's recording is acoustic with strings and backing vocals supporting the melody. Fardon's version adds a brass section and percussion while reducing the background singing. The Raiders used similar instruments to Fardon, and included an electronic organ that holds the melody line.

Raiders version

In 1971, Mark Lindsay, the lead singer of the Raiders, was looking for new material for his solo career (that included the Top 10 "Arizona"). The Columbia A&R head, Jack Gold, offered "Indian Reservation" to him, which the latter was already familiar with because of the Don Fardon version. Lindsay tried to record it with his producer Jerry Fuller. But Fuller was unavailable to produce the record, so Lindsay decided to produce it himself.

In the recording, Lindsay cut the basic track with session musicians of the Wrecking Crew, and later overdubbed backing singers and strings arranged by John D'Andrea. According to Lindsay, when he suggested ending the song with an organ riff similar to the one in Janis Ian’s “Society's Child”, the song's arranger Artie Butler, who also played the organ in the track, suggested that they re-use it, as he was the organist on "Society's Child". The original track was recorded on December 3, 1970.

Lindsay decided to bill it as a Raiders single and had fellow member Paul Revere promoting it on several radio stations across the country. After four years without a Top 10 hit since "Him or Me – What's It Gonna Be?", "Indian Reservation" reached the top of the charts on July 24, becoming the first and only number one hit of (Paul Revere &) the Raiders. In Canada, the song was number 2 for four weeks.

Personnel

According to the AFM contract sheet, the following musicians played on the track.
Mark Lindsay – lead vocals
Hal Blaine – drums
Artie Butler – piano, organ
Gary Coleman – vibraslap, vibraphone
John D'Andrea – strings arrangements
Carol Kaye – bass guitar
Louie Shelton – guitar
David Cohen - guitar
Unknown singers – backing vocals

Charts 
The Raiders' "Indian Reservation" entered the Billboard Hot 100 on April 10, 1971. It climbed to number 2 on July 3, where it stayed for three consecutive weeks, stuck behind Carole King's double single "It's Too Late"/"I Feel the Earth Move". On July 24, it reached the top spot for a single week. "Indian Reservation" spent a total of 22 weeks on the Billboard Hot 100 chart.

Weekly charts 
The Raiders

Don Fardon

Orlando Riva Sound

999

Year-end charts 
The Raiders

Other versions 
Billy ThunderKloud & the Chieftones recorded the song in 1976 for Polydor Records, taking their version to number 74 on Hot Country Songs.

A disco version was recorded by the German band Orlando Riva Sound in 1979. It was a national chart success, reaching number 7 and staying five weeks in the German Top 10.

The English punk band 999 released their version on November 14, 1981, on the Albion Ion label, and it reached number 51 in the UK chart.

The American hardcore punk band Ill Repute released a version titled "Cherokee Nation" on their 1984 album "What Happens Next?"

Indigenous electronic music group the Halluci Nation has sampled the song on several occasions.

Native American Country artist Buddy Red Bow covered the song for his self titled album.

See also 
 List of anti-war songs
 Paul Revere & the Raiders discography
 Stereotypes of indigenous peoples of Canada and the United States

References

External links 
 SuperSeventies singles
 FM music
 

Cherokee in popular culture
Songs written by John D. Loudermilk
1959 songs
1968 singles
Pye Records singles
1971 singles
Columbia Records singles
Billboard Hot 100 number-one singles
Cashbox number-one singles
Paul Revere & the Raiders songs
Songs against racism and xenophobia
Songs about Native Americans